Tore Johansson (born 6 November 1959) is a Swedish record producer, composer and musician based in Malmö, Sweden.

Biography
In an interview with HitQuarters, Johansson claimed that the main impetus for his becoming a music producer was the lack of good recording studios in the Malmö area at that time in which to record his own band. As a result,

"my friends and me decided to build a studio for recording our own music, and then I started to record other bands here and ended up as an engineer/producer. It wasn’t something I had planned."

Untutored in the art of recording, he acquired his skills through "trial and error". His main inspiration at that time was classic recordings from the 1960s and '70s, and in fact attempted to capture an old style in a conscious reaction against the production methods employed at that time, which he and his friends thought were bad.

His first five years as a producer were largely focused on developing the Swedish indie band The Cardigans, for whom Johansson has produced five of their six albums to date, beginning with the 1994 debut Emmerdale, excluding their fifth studio album Long Gone Before Daylight due to artistic differences. As someone as new to the studio as the band these sessions were an equally valuable learning experience for both parties. According to Johansson, each time they started on a new album, "we sat down and listened to the old album and decided what we liked about it and what we didn't like about it and what direction the new album should go in." More recently, Johansson prefers to write for or co-write with solo artists.

Production work
Johansson has gained particular international recognition through his production work with The Cardigans and Franz Ferdinand, but has also worked with a number of other recording artists such as:

a-ha
A Camp
Anouk
Nicole Atkins & the Sea
Mathieu Boogaerts
Melanie C
The Cardigans
Eggstone
Sophie Ellis-Bextor
Tomoyo Harada
Mayumi Iizuka – Smile×Smile
Tom Jones
Kira and The Kindred Spirits
David Kitt
The Little Flames
The Mighty Roars
OK Go
New Order
Bonnie Pink
The Redwalls
Saint Etienne
Solveig Sandnes
Suede
Titiyo
Emilíana Torrini
Martha Wainwright
Wild Beasts
WIT
Bertine Zetlitz
Cia Cia Her
Åtta Bier ti min far
As Animals

References

External links
Interview, HitQuarters Feb 2008

Musicians from Skåne County
Swedish record producers
British record producers
English record producers
Swedish songwriters
Musicians from Malmö
Living people
1959 births